Brazil competed at the 2016 Winter Youth Olympics in Lillehammer, Norway from 12 to 21 February 2016.

Alpine skiing

Boys

Bobsleigh

Cross-country skiing

Boys

Curling 

Brazil qualified automatically a mixed team of four athletes.

Mixed team

Team: Victor Santos (skip), Giovanna Barros (third), Elian Rocha (second), Raissa Rodrigues (lead)

Round Robin

Draw 1

Draw 2

Draw 3

Draw 4

Draw 5

Draw 6

Draw 7

Mixed doubles

Round 32

Round 16

Skeleton

References

External links
 Brasil nos Jogos de Lillehammer 2016

Nations at the 2016 Winter Youth Olympics
2016
2016 in Brazilian sport